Graffiti Kingdom is a 2004 action role-playing game developed by Taito for the PlayStation 2. It is the sequel to Magic Pengel: The Quest for Color (2002) and was released in North America by Hot-B and in PAL regions by 505 GameStreet. The game's soundtrack was composed by Yasunori Mitsuda.

Gameplay
As in Magic Pengel: The Quest for Color, the player is able to create characters (known as "Graffiti Creatures") by drawing its body parts and assigning a function (such as "leg" or "head") to each part; however, unlike the previous game, its attacks and movement can also be customized. Additional functions are added as the player's level increases, and new attacks can be obtained by "capturing" other creatures.

The versatility of this feature has attracted considerable popularity, largely in Japan—a number of players have created detailed characters based both on original designs and those from existing video games, anime and other media. (see links)

While combat in Magic Pengel used a turn-based battle system similar to rock–paper–scissors, Graffiti Kingdom is a more action-oriented platform game, although it retains some RPG-style elements such as the ability to level up.

Plot
The player takes the role of Prince Pixel of the Canvas Kingdom. Long ago, the kingdom was besieged by an evil Devil. This Devil was sealed away by a few brave knights bestowed with the power of Graffiti (called Graffiticians). Pixel happens upon the Devil's seal whilst avoiding his studies and takes the graffiti wand, breaking the seal. After an attempt by the seal's guardian, Pastel, to teach Pixel to use the wand results in the Devil's release, Pastel has Pixel face the Devil and restore the kingdom. Along the way, he meets Tablet, the Devil's son, who helps Pixel and challenges him throughout his adventures.  He makes his way through the first few worlds, beating their bosses and acquiring their keys. En route to Palette, Tablet's sister, Pastel is kidnapped by Palette's agent. Pixel proceeds to fight his way to Palette's palace, reaffirming the friendship Pixel has with Pastel. Pixel then faces off with Palette, defeating her. However, Tablet is seemingly killed when he takes an attack meant for Pixel. Determined to stop the Devil, Pixel fights through the Devil's palace and beats the Devil, leaving him near defeat. However, Tablet steals Pixel's wand and defeats his father instead before declaring himself the new Devil. Pastel gives Pixel a spare wand (many others of which she keeps inside her). Pixel defeats Tablet and creates a new body for him. Pixel then stops Pastel from re-sealing the Devil, which would also cause Pastel to be sealed in with him. The Devil escapes once more, albeit now weakened severely. Pixel agrees to let the Devil recuperate if he restores the kingdom as best he can. The ending cinematic shows Palette rampaging through the town before being battled offscreen by Pixel and Tablet.

Reception

The game received "average" reviews according to the review aggregation website Metacritic. In Japan, Famitsu gave it a score of one seven, one eight, and two sevens for a total of 29 out of 40. GamePro and Official U.S. PlayStation Magazine gave it a favorable review about two-and-a-half months before the game's U.S. release.

References

External links
 Official website 
 

2004 video games
505 Games games
Graffiti video games
Hot B games
PlayStation 2 games
PlayStation 2-only games
Taito games
Multiplayer and single-player video games
Video games scored by Yasunori Mitsuda
Video games developed in Japan